The Wales national rugby union team represents Wales in men's international rugby union. Its governing body, the Welsh Rugby Union (WRU), was established in 1881, the same year that Wales played their first international against England. The team plays its home matches at the Millennium Stadium in Cardiff (currently known for sponsorship reasons as the Principality Stadium), which replaced Cardiff Arms Park as the national stadium of Wales in 1999.

Wales has competed annually in the Six Nations Championship (previously the Home Nations Championship and Five Nations Championship) since it was established in 1883. They have won the tournament (and its predecessors) outright 28 times, most recently in 2021. Since the Six Nations was formed in 2000, Wales have won six Six Nations titles, including four Grand Slams and finished bottom once. Wales has also participated in every Rugby World Cup since the competition was established in 1987; they finished third in the inaugural tournament and have since made two semi-finals, in 2011 and 2019. Wales were the host nation for the 1999 Rugby World Cup, although matches were also played in England, Scotland, Ireland and France.

The Wales team experienced their first 'golden age' between 1900 and 1911; they first played New Zealand in 1905, winning 3–0 in a famous match at Cardiff Arms Park, and between March 1907 and January 1910, they won 11 consecutive matches, a record that stood for over a century. Welsh rugby struggled between the two World Wars, but experienced a second 'golden age' between 1969 and 1980, when they won eight Five Nations Championships. In addition to their Six Nations successes, Wales also finished fourth at both the 2011 Rugby World Cup and 2019 Rugby World Cup. Additionally Wales won 14 consecutive matches between March 2018 and March 2019, and reached number 1 in the World Rugby Rankings for the first time in August 2019. Eight former Welsh players have been inducted into the World Rugby Hall of Fame; 10 were inducted into the International Rugby Hall of Fame prior to its 2014 merger into the World Rugby Hall of Fame.

History

Early years (1881–1892)
Rugby union took root in Wales in 1850, when Reverend Rowland Williams became Vice-Principal at St David's College, Lampeter, and introduced the sport there. Wales played their first international match on 19 February 1881; organised by Newport's Richard Mullock and captained by James Bevan, they played against England, losing by seven goals, one drop goal and six tries to nil (82–0 in modern scoring values). On 12 March 1881, the Welsh Rugby Union was formed at The Castle Hotel, Neath. Two years later, the Home Nations Championship – now the Six Nations Championship – was first played, but Wales did not register a win. However, rugby in Wales developed and, by the 1890s, the Welsh had introduced the "four three-quarters" formation – with seven backs and eight forwards instead of six backs and nine forwards – which revolutionised the sport and was eventually adopted almost universally at international and club level.

First 'golden age' (1893–1913)

With the "four three-quarters" formation, Wales won the Home Nations Championship for the first time in 1893, winning the Triple Crown in the process. Wales next won the Championship in 1900, heralding the first "golden age" of Welsh rugby, which was to last until 1911. They won two more Triple Crowns in 1902 and 1905, and were runners-up in 1901, 1903 and 1904.

In 1906, Wales again won the Home Nations Championship, and later that year played South Africa for the first time. Wales were favourites to win the match, but South Africa dominated in the forwards and eventually won 11–0. Two years later, on 12 December 1908, Wales played the touring Australians, who they defeated 9–6.

In 1909, Wales won the Home Nations Championship and then, in 1910 – with the inclusion of France – the first Five Nations. In 1911, Wales took the first Five Nations Grand Slam, winning all their matches in the tournament. It would be nearly 40 years before they achieved a Grand Slam again. England's defeat of Wales at Cardiff in 1913 was Wales' first home loss to one of the Home Nations since 1899, and their first home loss to England since 1895. The Great War came in 1914 and rugby was suspended for the duration.

The Game of the Century 

When Wales faced New Zealand at Cardiff Arms Park in late 1905, they had not lost at home since 1899. This New Zealand team – referred to as The Original All Blacks – was the first of the southern hemisphere national teams to visit the British Isles, and were undefeated on their tour up to that point, having already beaten England, Ireland and Scotland.

Before the match, New Zealand team performed a haka (a Māori posture dance); the 47,000-strong crowd responded with the Welsh national anthem – Hen Wlad Fy Nhadau ("Land of My Fathers") – the first time a national anthem had been sung before a sporting fixture. Wales wing Teddy Morgan scored a try to give Wales a 3–0 lead, before New Zealand's Bob Deans claimed to have scored a try, only to be dragged behind the goal-line before the referee arrived. The referee awarded a scrum to Wales and the score remained unchanged; Wales won 3–0. The loss was New Zealand's only defeat on their 35-match tour.

Post-war years (1920–1968)

The post-First World War years marked a decline in Welsh rugby. An industrial recession struck the country, and hurt South Wales in particular. Welsh international results in the 1920s mirrored the performance of the economy: of their 42 matches, they won only 17, with three drawn. Half a million people emigrated from Wales to find work elsewhere during the depression; this included many Welsh rugby union internationals, who moved to the professional code of rugby league. Between 1923 and 1928, Wales managed only seven victories – five of them against France. However, even France managed to defeat Wales that decade, achieving their first victory in 1928. Welsh selection policy reflected the upheavals of the mid-1920s. In 1924, 35 different players were selected for Wales' four matches, with a different captain for each, and only Edward Watkins in the backs and Charlie Pugh in the forwards playing in all four matches.

A resurgence of both economy and rugby union followed in the 1930s and, in 1931, Wales won their first championship for nine years. That year, for the first time since the First World War, Wales retained the same side for two consecutive matches when they faced England and Scotland. Then, in 1933, captained by Watcyn Thomas, Wales defeated England at Twickenham. In 1935, Wales beat the touring New Zealand side 13–12, with Haydn Tanner making his first appearance. Although the Five Nations Championship was suspended during the Second World War, Wales did play a Red Cross charity match against England at Cardiff in 1940, losing 18–9.

After the Second World War, Wales played a New Zealand Army team (the Kiwis) in 1946, losing 11–3. The Five Nations (suspended during the war) resumed in 1947, when Wales shared the title with England. Although Wales suffered their first home defeat to France in 1948, they won their first Five Nations Grand Slam since 1911 in 1950. The next year, they lost 6–3 to the touring South Africans, despite dominating in the line-outs. They achieved another Grand Slam in 1952, followed by a 13–8 win over New Zealand in 1953. In 1954, St Helen's in Swansea (a Welsh international venue since 1882) hosted its last international and Cardiff Arms Park officially became the home of the Welsh team. In 1956, Wales again won the Five Nations, but they did not regain the title until 1964 and did not win it outright until 1965.

Wales conducted their first overseas tour in 1964, playing several games and one test in South Africa. They lost the test against South Africa in Durban 24–3, their biggest defeat in 40 years. At the WRU annual general meeting that year, the outgoing WRU President D. Ewart Davies declared that "it was evident from the experience of the South African Tour that a much more positive attitude to the game was required in Wales ... Players must be prepared to learn, and indeed re-learn, to the absolute point of mastery, the basic principles of Rugby Union football". This started the coaching revolution. The WRU Coaching Committee – set up in the late 1950s – was given the task of improving the quality of coaching and, in January 1967, Ray Williams was appointed Coaching Organiser. The first national coach, David Nash, was appointed in 1967 to coach Wales for the season, but resigned when the WRU refused to allow him to accompany Wales on their 1968 tour of Argentina. Eventually, the WRU reversed their decision, appointing Clive Rowlands to tour as coach. Of the six matches, Wales won three, drew two and lost one.

Second 'golden age' (1969–1979)
Wales enjoyed a second "golden age" in the 1970s, with world-class players such as Gareth Edwards, J. P. R. Williams, Gerald Davies, Barry John, and Mervyn Davies in their side. Wales dominated Northern Hemisphere rugby between 1969 and 1979, and managed an incredible winning record, losing only seven times during that period. Wales toured New Zealand for the first time in 1969, but were defeated in both matches. In the second test, which they lost 33–12, New Zealand fullback Fergie McCormick scored 24 points; a record at the time.

In 1970, Wales shared the Five Nations with France, and recorded a 6–6 draw against South Africa in Cardiff. The following year, Wales recorded their first Five Nations Grand Slam since 1952. Using only 16 players in four games, the 1971 side achieved their most notable win of the tournament in their victory over Scotland; after a last-minute try by Gerald Davies that reduced Scotland's lead to 18–17, flanker John Taylor kicked a conversion from the sideline described as "the greatest conversion since St Paul" to give Wales a 19–18 win. Wales contributed more players than any other team to the British Lions side that toured New Zealand that year. Those Lions became the only ones to win a series over New Zealand.

In the 1972 Five Nations Championship, Wales and Scotland refused to travel to Ireland at the height of the Troubles after receiving threats, purportedly from the Irish Republican Army. The Championship remained unresolved with Wales and Ireland unbeaten. Although the Five Nations was a five-way tie in 1973, the Welsh did defeat Australia 24–0 in Cardiff.

Wales next won the Five Nations outright in 1975, and in 1976, Wales won their second Grand Slam of the decade. Just like the first in 1971, they used only 16 players over their four matches. They repeated the feat in 1978 and, in the process, became the first team to win three consecutive Triple Crowns. Following their final Five Nations match of 1978, both Phil Bennett and Gareth Edwards retired from rugby.

Wales hosted New Zealand at Cardiff Arms Park in November 1978, losing 13–12 after a late penalty goal by the replacement New Zealand fullback, Brian McKechnie. The penalty was controversial because New Zealand lock Andy Haden had dived out of a line-out in an attempt to earn a penalty. Haden later admitted that he and Frank Oliver had pre-agreed this tactic should they find themselves in difficulties. Referee Roger Quittenton was criticised by the press for failing to notice the dive, but he later stated that the penalty had been given against Welsh lock Geoff Wheel for jumping off the shoulder of Oliver. Quittenton later said, "Haden's perception is that his dive secured the penalty. That is a load of rubbish". Wales then went on to win the 1979 Five Nations with a Triple Crown.

Barren years (1980–2003)

In 1980, the WRU's centenary year, Wales lost 23–3 to New Zealand in Cardiff, with the All Blacks scoring four tries to nil. Wales won two matches in the Five Nations Championships of both 1980 and 1981, and in 1983 were nearly upset by Japan, winning 29–24 at Cardiff. In 1984, Australia defeated Wales 28–9 at Cardiff Arms Park.

Wales achieved only one win in 1987's Five Nations before contesting the inaugural Rugby World Cup. Wales defeated Ireland in their crucial pool fixture, before defeating England in the quarter-finals. They then faced hosts New Zealand, who won 49–6, but beat Australia in the third place play-off game to claim third. The next year Wales won the Triple Crown for the first time since 1979, but heavy defeats on tour to New Zealand later that year saw the end of a number of Welsh players' careers, as several converted to rugby league.

Welsh rugby reached a nadir when Wales suffered their first Five Nations Championship whitewash; they had upset England in 1989 to avoid losing all their Championship matches that season, but in 1990, Wales were defeated in all four Five Nations' matches for the first time, before almost doing the same the following year. The 1991 World Cup saw further frustration, when Wales were upset by Samoa in their opening match. A second group-stage loss, by 38–3 to Australia, eliminated Wales from the tournament.

After winning two Five Nations games in 1992, and one in 1993, Wales won the Championship in 1994 on points difference. But without defeating one of Australia, New Zealand or South Africa during the inter-World Cup period, and again losing all four of their matches at the 1995 Five Nations Championship, Wales was not considered a major contender for the 1995 Rugby World Cup. At the 1995 World Cup, after comprehensively beating Japan, Wales lost to New Zealand; this meant that they needed to defeat Ireland to qualify for the quarter-finals. Wales lost 24–23 and so failed to progress beyond the pool stage for the second time, and later that year Kevin Bowring replaced Alec Evans to become Wales' first full-time coach.

Record defeats of 51–0 to France and 96–13 to South Africa, prompted the WRU to appoint New Zealander Graham Henry as coach in 1998. Henry had early success as coach, leading Wales to a 10-match winning streak; this included Wales' first victory over South Africa, a 29–19 win in the first match played at the Millennium Stadium. Henry was consequently nicknamed "the Great Redeemer" by the Welsh media and fans, a reference to the opening line of Cwm Rhondda, a popular song among Welsh rugby fans. Hosting the 1999 World Cup, Wales qualified for the quarter-finals for the first time since 1987, but lost 24–9 to eventual champions Australia. A lack of success in the Five and Six Nations (Italy joined the tournament in 2000), and especially a number of heavy losses to Ireland, led to Henry's resignation in February 2002; his assistant Steve Hansen took over.

During Hansen's tenure, the WRU implemented a significant change in the structure of the game domestically. Regional teams were introduced as a tier above the traditional club-based structures in 2003, and the five (later four) regional sides became the top level of domestic professional rugby in the country. At the 2003 World Cup, Wales scored four tries in their 53–37 pool stage loss to New Zealand, before losing in the quarter-finals to the eventual tournament winners, England, despite outscoring them by three tries to one.

Revival under Ruddock and coaching changes (2004–2007) 

Coached by Mike Ruddock, Wales won their first Grand Slam since 1978 and their first Six Nations Grand Slam in 2005. A late long-range penalty from Gavin Henson gave them victory over England in Cardiff for the first time in 12 years, and after victories over Italy, France and Scotland, they faced Ireland in front of a capacity crowd at the Millennium Stadium where Wales' 32–20 victory gave them their first Championship since 1994. Later that year, they suffered a record home loss, 41–3 to New Zealand.

Ruddock resigned as head coach midway through the 2006 Six Nations, where Wales finished fifth, and Gareth Jenkins was eventually appointed as his replacement. Jenkins led Wales through the 2007 World Cup, where they failed to advance beyond the pool stage after losing their final game 38–34 to Fiji, thanks to a Graham Dewes try. Jenkins subsequently lost his job, and Warren Gatland, a New Zealander, was appointed as his successor.

Gatland era (2008–2019) 

Wales faced England at Twickenham for Gatland's inaugural match as coach and their first match of the 2008 Six Nations. They had not defeated England there since 1988, and went on to win 26–19. They eventually won all their matches in the Championship, conceding only two tries in the process, to claim another Grand Slam. Later that year, Wales defeated Australia 21–18 in Cardiff, but then started a six-year, 23-game winless streak against the southern hemisphere nations of Australia, New Zealand and South Africa.

At the 2011 World Cup, Wales reached the semi-finals for the first time since 1987, but lost 9–8 to France after captain Sam Warburton was sent off. The two teams met again in March 2012, with Wales needing a win to claim their third Six Nations Grand Slam in eight years, which they did with a 16–9 victory. This was followed immediately by an eight-match losing streak that was eventually broken during the 2013 Six Nations, where Wales retained the Championship for the first time since 1979. Wales reached the quarter-finals of the 2015 World Cup at the expense of hosts England, before losing 23–19 to South Africa. Wales also achieved a fourth Grand Slam in 14 years and their first in seven years in the 2019 Six Nations.

Wales reached the top spot in the men's World Rugby Rankings in August 2019, holding the position for two weeks. They went on to top their pool at the 2019 Rugby World Cup, winning all their pool matches for the first time since the inaugural tournament in 1987, and ultimately reached the semi-finals before they were knocked out by eventual champions South Africa; Wales lost to New Zealand in the bronze final and finished fourth in the tournament.

Pivac era (2019–2022) 
In July 2018, it was announced that then-Scarlets coach Wayne Pivac would succeed Gatland as Wales coach following the 2019 Rugby World Cup. Pivac's first match in charge was a match against a Barbarians side coach by Gatland in November 2019. Despite winning Pivac's first full international in charge in the 2020 Six Nations against Italy, Wales only recorded two other wins all year, finishing fifth in both the Six Nations and the Autumn Nations Cup. 2021 saw highs and lows. Wales won their fourth Six Nations title of the last decade, though they fell short of winning the Grand Slam at the death of their final match against France in Paris. They faced Argentina in a two-match test series, in which they drew the opening game and Wales lost in the second game 33–11. That autumn, Wales opened with losses to New Zealand and South Africa before beating Fiji and Australia.

Wales slumped to a fifth place finish in the 2022 Six Nations Championship, their sole win coming at home against Scotland. In the final week of the tournament, Wales lost to Italy 22–21, their first ever home loss to the Italians.

They then embarked on a tour to South Africa over the summer. Wales narrowly lost the first test, losing 32–29 after a late penalty from Springbok outside half Handre Pollard. The following week, Wales secured their first ever win on South African soil, winning 13–12 in Bloemfontein. South Africa won the final test, and secured a 2–1 series win.

Return of Gatland (2022–present) 
On 5 December 2022, Warren Gatland was reappointed as head coach, following a review of Wayne Pivac and his performance in the 2022 Autumn Nations Series. The contract will see Gatland as head coach through to the end of the 2023 Rugby World Cup, with the potential to extend an additional four years, through the 2027 Rugby World Cup. Gatland's initial coaching team included Alex King as attack coach, Mike Forshaw as defence coach, Jonathan Humphreys as forwards coach and Neil Jenkins as skills coach. Jonathan Thomas was added as a contact area skils coach.

Strip

Wales play in red jerseys, white (or some times, black) shorts and red socks. For the 2015–16 season, the jersey design incorporated gold for the first time. The jerseys are embroidered with the WRU logo, which is based on the Prince of Wales's feathers. The original motto beneath the feathers was a German phrase, Ich dien, meaning I serve, but this has been replaced with large letters reading WRU.

Wales's alternate strip is green jerseys, white shorts and green socks, although there have been various different coloured strips in the past. Former change strips worn by Wales have used black, navy, white, yellow and grey as their predominant colours. Wales previously wore black jerseys as part of celebrations for the WRU's 125th anniversary in 2005. The jersey was worn against Fiji and then Australia that year; the Australia match was the first time Wales had not played in their red jersey against one of their traditional rivals.

In 1992, the Welsh Rugby Union agreed a deal with Cotton Traders to produce the national team's kits. They were replaced in 1996 by Reebok, whose contract with the Welsh Rugby Union was worth £1.3 million in 1999. Wales received the first jersey sponsor in their history in 2000, when Redstone Telecoms agreed a deal worth £2 million. Redstone was replaced two years later by Reebok subsidiary Rockport, in a deal worth £1 million, followed by Brains Brewery in 2004, in conjunction with a four-year extension to the Reebok deal. Due to French alcohol advertising regulations, the "Brains" name was replaced by "Brawn" for the 2005 Six Nations Championship match between France and Wales at the Stade de France, and by "Brawn Again" for the corresponding match two years later. The Brains deal was extended in June 2008 until September 2009, with "Brains SA" appearing on Wales home shirts and "SA Gold" appearing on the team's yellow change shirts. For the away match against France in February 2009, the "Brains SA" logo was replaced by the words "Try Essai"; "essai" is the French word for a try, but is also pronounced the same as "SA", meaning the branding could have been viewed as "an invitation to 'try' Wales' best loved beer brand".

In 2008, Under Armour replaced Reebok as Wales' kit manufacturer in a four-year deal worth £10 million. Welsh insurance company Admiral replaced Brains as the main shirt sponsors in 2010, signing a three-year contract. That deal was extended by two years in both in 2013 and 2015, with the latter described as the WRU's "biggest shirt partnership deal in its history". In 2017, Japanese motor company Isuzu Motors replaced Admiral as the main sponsors of the Wales team's home shirts, while sponsorship of the team's away shirts was taken on by Subaru as a result of both companies' UK imports being handled by IM Group. In October 2015, the WRU agreed a nine-year, £33 million extension to its contract with Under Armour, only for both parties to mutually terminate the deal four years early in 2020. A new, seven-year contract with Italian company Macron was agreed in September 2020, believed to be worth around £30 million.

Support

Rugby union and Wales' national team hold an important place in Welsh culture and society. Sport historian John Bale has stated that "rugby is characteristically Welsh", and David Andrew said that "To the popular consciousness, rugby is as Welsh as coal mining, male voice choirs, How Green Was My Valley, Dylan Thomas, and Tom Jones". Welsh rugby's first 'golden age' (1900–1911) coincided with the country's zenith during the 20th century, and rugby was important in building Wales' modern identity. There is a long tradition of Welsh supporters singing before and during matches. The choral tradition developed in Wales during the 19th century alongside the rise of nonconformity, and has extended to singing at rugby matches. Commonly sung songs include the hymn Cwm Rhondda, Tom Jones' Delilah, and Max Boyce's Hymns and Arias.

Home stadium

Wales' first home international was played in 1882 at St Helen's Ground in Swansea. In the 1880s and 1890s, home Welsh internationals were played at Cardiff, Swansea, Newport and Llanelli. Swansea continued to be used as an international venue until 1954, when Cardiff Arms Park became Wales' primary home venue. Cardiff Arms Park first had a stand erected in 1881, and continued to expand its seating that decade. Crowds continued to grow and in 1902 in Wales' match against Scotland a world record 40,000 spectators paid to see the match. In 1911, the owners of the Arms Park, the Marquess of Bute's family, confirmed Wales' tenure and during the 1920s and 1930s, Wales gradually gained increasing control. A new stand was built at the park in the 1933–34 season, which increased the grounds' capacity to 56,000.

By 1958, the WRU had concluded that a new national ground was needed due to flooding that often affected Arms Park. After debate and disputes between the WRU and various other parties, including Cardiff RFC, it was decided in the 1960s that a new national stadium would be built with a new ground for the Cardiff club backing onto it. The National Stadium, as it was known, was officially opened in 1970.

Since 1999, Wales have played all their home matches at the 74,500-capacity Millennium Stadium, Cardiff, which is also Wales' national stadium. The Millennium Stadium was first conceived in 1994, when a group redevelopment committee was set up. It was decided to replace the National Stadium at Cardiff Arms Park after a review found it was out of date; new legislation also required stadia to be all-seated. Construction of the new stadium began in September 1997, and was completed by June 1999, in time for the Rugby World Cup. The construction, which cost the WRU £126 million, was funded by private investment, £46 million of public funds from the National Lottery, the sale of debentures to supporters (offering guaranteed tickets in exchange for an interest-free loan), and loans. While the new ground was being built, Wales used the old Wembley Stadium for their home matches – a deal reciprocated during construction of the new Wembley, when FA Cup finals were held at the Millennium Stadium.

Record

Six Nations
Wales compete annually in the Six Nations Championship, which is played against five other European nations: England, France, Ireland, Italy, and Scotland. The Six Nations started as the Home Nations Championship in 1883, as a contest between the four component nations of the United Kingdom. Wales first won it in 1893, when they achieved a Triple Crown. Wales have won the tournament outright 28 times, and shared 12 other victories. Their longest wait between championships was 11 years (1994–2005). Wales first won a Grand Slam in 1908 – although France did not officially join the Five Nations until 1910 – and their first Six Nations Grand Slam in 2005. Their most recent Grand Slam was won in 2019 with victory over Ireland on the final day of the Six Nations tournament. Their most recent Triple Crown was won in 2021 with victory over England in the third round of the Six Nations tournament.

World Cup

Wales have contested every Rugby World Cup since the inaugural tournament in 1987.

The 1987 tournament was Wales' most successful; they won all three pool matches and their quarter-final, before losing to the All Blacks in the semi-finals. They then faced Australia in the third place play-off match, which they won 22–21.

In the next two tournaments in 1991 and 1995, Wales failed to progress beyond the pool stage, winning just one match in each tournament. They also became the first co host nation to not make it out of the pool stage in 1991.

Both the 1999 and 2003 tournaments were more successful, with Wales qualifying for the quarter-finals both times. Wales hosted the event in 1999 and topped their pool only to lose to eventual winners Australia in the quarter-finals.

In 2003, they finished second in their pool behind the All Blacks, and faced England in the quarter-finals. They lost to England, the eventual champions, 28–17. Wales conceded 17 penalties, and their lack of discipline proved costly.

In the 2007 World Cup, Wales again failed to progress from the pool stage. After a loss to Australia, and two wins against Japan and Canada, they faced Fiji for a place in the quarter-finals. The game started poorly for Wales who were behind 25–3 at half-time. They fought back to lead by three points with six minutes remaining, but Fiji then scored a try to win 38–34 and eliminated Wales from the tournament.

At the 2011 World Cup, Wales reached the semi-finals for the first time since 1987. Playing the semi-finals against France, Wales lost 9–8, in a game overshadowed by the 18th-minute sending off of Wales' captain Sam Warburton for a dangerous tackle against Vincent Clerc.

At the 2015 World Cup Wales were in the same pool as Australia, England, Fiji and Uruguay. They finished second in the pool behind Australia and ahead of hosts England. South Africa defeated Wales in the quarter-finals.

In the 2019 World Cup Wales were in pool D with Australia, Fiji, Georgia and Uruguay. They won all their group matches to finish top of the pool. After defeating France in the quarter-finals, they lost to the eventual tournament winners South Africa in the semi-finals.

Overall

When the World Rugby Rankings were introduced in October 2003, Wales were ranked 8th. They rose to 7th in June 2004, before falling back to 8th in November that year. Following a Grand Slam win in the 2005 Six Nations, they rose to a ranking position of 5th. They fell to 9th by June 2006, and, after rising back to 8th by September, fell to 10th after the 2007 World Cup. A second Six Nations' Grand Slam in 2008 propelled them to 6th in the rankings, but following losses to South Africa in the mid-year and end-of-year internationals Wales slipped to 7th. Wales climbed to 4th after a win over Scotland in their first match of the 2009 Six Nations. They slumped to 9th in 2010 but rose back to 4th after their fourth place in the 2011 World Cup. Since then, Wales have ranked the majority of the time among the top six teams. They reached 2nd during the 2015 Rugby World Cup, before hitting top spot for the first time on 19 August 2019, after winning 15 of their last 16 games.

Wales have won 401 of their 778 Test matches. Their biggest Test defeat was a 96–13 loss to South Africa in 1998, and their largest victory was a 98–0 defeat of Japan in 2004. Their record for most tries in a match is 16, scored against Portugal in 1994 – they also scored 102 points in this match, more than in any other Test. Wales' record for consecutive Test wins is 14, and for consecutive losses is 10.

Below is table of the representative rugby matches played by a Wales national XV at test level up until 18 March 2023.

Players

Current squad
On 17 January 2023, Wales coach Warren Gatland named a 37-man squad for the Six Nations.

On 24 January 2023, Scott Baldwin was called up to replace Dewi Lake.

Head coach:  Warren Gatland

Caps and clubs updated as of 12 March 2023.

Notable players

Eighteen Welsh internationals have been inducted into the World Rugby Hall of Fame. One Welsh player, Shane Williams in 2008, has been awarded World Rugby Player of the Year (formerly known as the International Rugby Board Player of the Year).

Individual records
See List of Wales national rugby union team records; and List of Wales national rugby union players for a sortable list containing player caps and tries

Neil Jenkins was the first rugby player to surpass 1000 Test points. He holds several Welsh records, including the most points scored for Wales with 1049, the most successful penalty kicks for Wales with 248, and the Welsh record for most points in a single Test match with 30. The record for drop-goals for Wales is held by Jonathan Davies with 13.

Shane Williams is Wales' record try-scorer with 58 tries. Williams is also Wales' record try-scorer in Six Nations Championships with 22 and the Rugby World Cups with 10. Colin Charvis' 22 tries is the all-time Welsh record for a forward, and was the world record for tries by a forward until 2011.

Alun Wyn Jones is the nation's most capped player with 158 Welsh caps. Seven other players have earned 100 caps or more: Gethin Jenkins, Stephen Jones, Gareth Thomas, Martyn Williams, George North, Dan Biggar and Taulupe Faletau The record for most matches as captain is held by Alun Wyn Jones with 52. The record for the most consecutive appearances is held by Gareth Edwards who played all 53 of his matches for Wales consecutively between 1967 and 1978. Edwards is also Wales' youngest ever captain at the age of 20.

The youngest player ever capped for Wales is Tom Prydie, who made his debut in Wales' 2010 Six Nations finale on 20 March 2010 against Italy at age , beating the record set by Norman Biggs in 1888. Prydie is also Wales' youngest try-scorer, scored against South Africa in June 2010, overtaking the record that Tom Pearson set on his debut in 1891. Winger George North, aged 18 years 214 days, overtook Pearson's record as the youngest Wales player to score a try on debut in November 2010.

Welsh Sports Hall of Fame
The following Welsh players have been inducted into the Welsh Sports Hall of Fame:

 1990 – Ken Jones
 1991 – Cliff Jones, Cliff Morgan
 1992 – Gerald Davies
 1994 – J. P. R. Williams
 1997 – Bleddyn Williams
 1998 – Gareth Edwards, Lewis Jones
 1999 – Carwyn James, Barry John
 2000 – David Watkins
 2001 – Mervyn Davies
 2002 – Gwyn Nicholls
 2003 – Jonathan Davies, Willie Davies, John Dawes
 2005 – John Gwilliam
 2007 – Arthur Gould, Phil Bennett
 2008 – Billy Trew
 2009 – J. J. Williams
 2012 – Bryn Meredith
 2013 – Clive Rowlands
 2015 – Wilf Wooller
 2017 – Graham Price
 2019 – Steve Fenwick

Coaches

Following the unsuccessful tour to South Africa in 1964, the WRU set up a working party on coaching. The party recommended that Welsh clubs accept the principle of coaching. David Nash was appointed as the national team's first coach in 1967, but for the 1968 tour of Argentina, the WRU initially planned not to have a coach tour with the team. Following pressure from the Welsh clubs at the WRU's annual general meeting, the decision was reversed and Clive Rowlands was appointed as coach for the tour. The appointing of a coach for the team coincided with Wales' success in the Five Nations during the 1970s.

Coaching history

Current coaching staff
Correct as of 17 January 2023

See also

 Wales national rugby sevens team
 Welsh Rugby Players Association
 Campaign to change the WRU logo

Notes

References

Bibliography

External links

 

 
European national rugby union teams
Rugby union in Wales